Dębiny  is a village in the administrative district of Gmina Łubianka, within Toruń County, Kuyavian-Pomeranian Voivodeship, in north-central Poland.

In 2005 the village had a population of 275.

References

Villages in Toruń County